Vico nel Lazio is a comune (municipality) in the Province of Frosinone in the Italian region Lazio, located about  east of Rome and about  north of Frosinone.

References

Cities and towns in Lazio